Amadeus Revenge is a music-based shoot 'em up game published by System Editoriale s.r.l. in 1988 for the Commodore 64. The game was developed using the Shoot-'Em-Up Construction Kit.

Gameplay

The player plays the part of Wolfgang Amadeus Mozart or Amadeus as he is known in the game. The goal of the game is to complete Mozart's famous Piano Concerto No. 25, (K. 503), referred to in-game as simply Concerto in C. To do this the player must navigate Amadeus across reams of sheet music while eliminating the conflicting notes produced by rival musicians such as Antonio Salieri. As a rival musician produces a conflicting note it is reproduced within the game score at the appropriate tone.

Reception
Reviewing the game in 1988, Commodore Computer Club praised the game for its graphics and sound and for its ability to draw in players. They also included the game on Disc No.6 for subscribers belonging to the Commodore 64 Club. As part of its coverage of successful DIY projects in 2011, Retro Gamer praised the game's "great use of the Commodore 64's sound chip". Australian news agency ABC Online noted that "while this modern interpretation of Mozart may seem a far stretch of the imagination, funnily enough it's an apt metaphor for what it's like to wander through an orchestra mid-performance".

References

External links
Amadeus Revenge at Gamebase64

1988 video games
Commodore 64 games
Commodore 64-only games
Cultural depictions of Wolfgang Amadeus Mozart
Video games based on real people
Europe-exclusive video games
Music video games
Video games based on musicians
Video games developed in the United Kingdom